Dean McDermott (born November 16, 1966)  is a Canadian actor best known as a reality television personality with his wife, actress Tori Spelling, and as the host of the cooking competition Chopped Canada. He played the role of Constable Renfield Turnbull on the TV series Due South.

Early life
McDermott was born in Toronto, Ontario, Canada, to David and Doreen McDermott.  He has three sisters, Dale, Dawn, and Dana. He graduated from North Albion Collegiate Institute in Rexdale, Ontario.

Career
McDermott has performed in films Open Range, Irvine Welsh's Ecstasy and Against the Ropes.

McDermott has appeared in several TV movies including Always and Forever, Santa Baby 2: Christmas Maybe and A Christmas Visitor.

McDermott has had a variety of guest and recurring roles on television series, such as Earth: Final Conflict, Tracker, 1-800-Missing, NCIS and CSI: Crime Scene Investigation. 2016 saw McDermott take on a starring role, portraying Iain Vaughn on Slasher.

Culinary arts
McDermott is a professionally trained chef. In 2013, he became a member of "Team Guy" on the second season of Food Network's Rachael vs. Guy: Celebrity Cook-Off and was the winner, and in January 2014, McDermott began hosting Chopped Canada on Food Network Canada. McDermott hosted Chopped Canada for two seasons, announcing in March 2015 that he would leave the show.

McDermott released a cookbook The Gourmet Dad, in which he wanted to make intimidating plates more attractive to kids.

Personal life
McDermott's first wife is actress Mary Jo Eustace. They have one child, son Jack Montgomery (born October 10, 1998). In July 2005, McDermott began filming the Lifetime TV movie Mind Over Murder in Ottawa, during which he met actress Tori Spelling, who was then married to writer-actor Charlie Shanian. Spelling and McDermott began cheating on their spouses the night they met. Upon his subsequent divorce from Eustace, McDermott was granted joint custody of their son Jack, opting not to move forward with the adoption of a baby girl, Lola, whom he and Eustace were in the process of adopting prior to their separation. However, according to recent Instagram posts, Tori Spelling refers to Lola Eustace as her “step daughter” and Lola refers to Dean McDermott as her “dad”.

McDermott married Tori Spelling on May 7, 2006, in Fiji. Spelling and McDermott renewed their vows on May 8, 2010, in Beverly Hills. Spelling and McDermott have five children: three sons, Liam Aaron (born March 13, 2007), Finn Davey (born August 30, 2012) and Beau Dean (born March 2, 2017) and two daughters, Stella Doreen (born June 9, 2008) and Hattie Margaret (born October 10, 2011).

On July 1, 2010, McDermott was involved in a dirt bike accident, his second motorcycle accident of the year. He was hospitalized in Los Angeles with a punctured and collapsed lung, and doctors said they expected him to make a full recovery. McDermott was released from the hospital on July 6, 2010.

McDermott became an American citizen at a ceremony in Los Angeles on August 21, 2010.

2013 cheating scandal and aftermath
In December 2013, after welcoming their second son, Us Weekly broke the news that McDermott was unfaithful to Spelling. The couple worked through the aftermath of the affair on a Lifetime series titled True Tori.

On January 23, 2014, a month after the news broke, McDermott's publicist announced McDermott had entered rehab for "some health and personal issues."

While McDermott and Spelling's marriage was back on track, the couple once again made headlines in 2016 for owing $39,000 to American Express in unpaid credit card bills. McDermott's mother-in-law Candy, who was also on good terms with her daughter, told TMZ at the time that she was helping out the family financially.

In March 2018, McDermott and Spelling were in contact with the police three times over the course of nine days. On Thursday, March 1, McDermott called the police around 7:00 am to say that Spelling was going through some sort of mental breakdown. Per an LAPD spokesperson, the situation ended up being a "domestic incident" and that "no crime" was committed. Nearly a week later, on Wednesday, March 7, the Ventura County Sheriff's Office showed up at a doctor's office around 9:45 am because of McDermott raising a concern. He called the police to check up on his wife after she had left their house with one of their kids and that he was worried about her well-being. The deputies located Spelling at the doctor's office, spoke to her and determined she and their kids were okay. Because no crime had been committed, no further action was taken. On Friday, March 9, Spelling and McDermott went out to dinner with their five children at the Black Bear Diner in Tarzana, California. However, the LAPD arrived at the restaurant and it appeared that the couple were having a serious conversation inside. Their meal was cut short when the family was escorted out the back of the restaurant. It was later reported that the reason why the police were called to the diner was because the paparazzi would not allow them to eat in peace and for the safety of Spelling, McDermott and their children, they needed a police escort from the restaurant.

It was reported in February 2019 that the couple appeared to be stronger than ever. According to Spelling, they didn't have relationship problems as they communicated.

In June 2021, it was reported that the couple's marriage has been in "trouble for over a year". They sparked split rumors after fans noticed that Spelling and McDermott stopped sharing photos of each other on social media and both being out and about without their wedding rings on. A source told Us Weekly that things between the couple are "not great". Spelling appeared on Jeff Lewis' radio show, Jeff Lewis Live, on June 16, 2021, and stated that she and McDermott do not sleep in the same bedroom anymore.

As of June 2022, McDermott and Spelling are currently in the midst of a trial separation. A source has said that they have considered ending their marriage. “They know divorce will be expensive and it’s not something they’re willing to go through right now. They both feel trapped,” the source says. “Having kids makes it more difficult because they don’t want their children to be unhappy, yet at the same time, Tori has been unhappy for quite a while now. They truly are still together for their kids.”

Filmography

Movies

Television

References

External links

1966 births
Living people
Male actors from Toronto
Canadian male film actors
Canadian male television actors
Canadian male voice actors
Canadian expatriate male actors in the United States
Canadian emigrants to the United States
20th-century Canadian male actors
21st-century Canadian male actors